Larry Paul Heck is currently the Rhesa Screven Farmer, Jr., Advanced Computing Concepts Chair, Georgia Research Alliance Eminent Scholar, and professor at the Georgia Institute of Technology.  His career spans many of the sub-disciplines of artificial intelligence, including conversational AI, speech recognition and speaker recognition, natural language processing, web search, online advertising and acoustics. He is probably best known for his role as the founder of the Microsoft Cortana Personal Assistant and his early work in deep learning for speech processing.

Education and career
Larry Heck was born in Havre, Montana. After receiving the Bachelor of Science in electrical engineering at Texas Tech University, he was admitted to graduate school at the Georgia Institute of Technology in 1986. Heck received the MSEE in 1989 and the PhD in 1991 under advisor Prof. James H. McClellan.

From 1992 to 1998, he was a senior research engineer at SRI International initially with the Acoustics and Radar Technology Lab (ARTL) and later with the Speech Technology and Research (STAR) Lab. Funded by the US government's NSA and DARPA, Heck led the SRI team that was the first to successfully create large-scale deep neural network (DNN) deep learning technology in the field of speech processing and the first to deploy a major industrial application of deep learning.  The deep learning technology was used to win the 1998 National Institute of Standards and Technology Speaker Recognition evaluation.

From 1998 to 2005, he was vice president of R&D at Nuance Communications, where he led the company's efforts in speech recognition, natural language processing, speaker recognition, and speech synthesis technology.

From 2005 to 2008, he was vice president of search & advertising sciences at Yahoo!, responsible for the company's search and advertising quality. In 2008, Heck worked with Yahoo! Research to combine the two organizations to form Yahoo! Labs.

Beginning in 2009, he was the chief scientist of speech products at Microsoft. In this role, he established the vision, mission and long-range plan and hired the initial team to create Microsoft’s digital-personal-assistant Cortana. Heck was named a Microsoft Distinguished Engineer in 2012 and joined Microsoft Research that same year.

In 2014, he joined Google as a principal research scientist, where he founded the deep learning-based conversational AI team "Deep Dialogue". The team works on advanced research for the Google Assistant.

In 2017, Heck joined Samsung as SVP and co-head of global AI Research. In 2019, he became head of Bixby (virtual assistant) North America and the CEO of Viv Labs, an independent subsidiary of Samsung.

Awards and honors
Larry Heck was named Fellow of the Institute of Electrical and Electronics Engineers (IEEE) in 2016 for leadership in application of machine learning to spoken and text language processing.

Heck received the 2017 Academy of Distinguished Engineering Alumni Award from the Georgia Institute of Technology. In the same year, he also received the Texas Tech University Whitacre College of Engineering Distinguished Engineer Award.

References 

Fellow Members of the IEEE
Living people
1963 births
Georgia Tech alumni
Texas Tech University alumni
People from Havre, Montana
Natural language processing researchers